Dąbrówka Szlachecka is a neighbourhood, and an area of the Municipal Information System, in the city of Warsaw, Poland, located within the district of Białołęka.

History 
Dąbrówka Szlachecka was founded in 13th century, as a landed property of the local nobility, and between 16th century, it was a folwark-type settlement belonging to nearby Tarchomin.

In 20th century, Dąbrówka Szlachecka used to be a small village near the city of Warsaw. On 15 May 1951, it had been incorporated into Warsaw.

References 

Neighbourhoods of Białołęka
Populated places established in the 13th century